The Fair Access to Science and Technology Research Act (FASTR) is a bill in the United States that would mandate earlier public release of taxpayer-funded research. The bill has been introduced in 2013, 2015, and 2017. Sen. Ron Wyden (D-Ore.) and Sen. John Cornyn (R-Texas) introduced the Senate version, while the bill was introduced to the House by Reps. Zoe Lofgren (D-Calif.), Mike Doyle (D-Penn.) and Kevin Yoder (R-Kans.).  The bill is a successor to the Federal Research Public Access Act (FRPAA), which had been introduced in 2006, 2010, and 2012.

Sen. Wyden explained the bill in a press release: 
"Breakthroughs in technology, science, medicine and dozens of other disciplines are made every year due to the billions in research funding provided by the American people.  Making those findings available to all Americans is the best way to lead the next generation of discovery and innovation or create the next game-changing business. The FASTR act provides that access because taxpayer funded research should never be hidden behind a paywall."

FASTR has been described as "The Other Aaron's Law", named for open-access activist Aaron Swartz who died in a dramatic case in support of open access research in January 2013.

The Senate Committee on Homeland Security and Governmental Affairs unanimously approved the bill on July 29, 2015.  It was the first time that the bill or any of its predecessors had gained committee approval and been forwarded to a full house of Congress.

The bill is often compared to and discussed in conjunction with the Public Access to Public Science (PAPS) Act, also introduced in 2013.

Executive action
Days after FASTR was introduced in 2013, the Executive Branch's Office of Science and Technology Policy (OSTP) issued a memorandum that "hereby directs each Federal agency with over $100 million in annual conduct of research and development expenditures to develop a plan to support increased public access to the results of research funded by the Federal Government."  The change was in part prompted by an online Whitehouse petition to "Require free access over the Internet to scientific journal articles arising from taxpayer-funded research."

See also
Open, Public, Electronic and Necessary Government Data Act (OPEN)

References

External links
 Senate version of FASTR (2015)
 Congress.gov
 House version H.R. 1477 (2015)
 Congress.gov
 Senate version of FASTR (2013)
 Congress.gov
 GovTrack.us
 OpenCongress
 THOMAS
 House version H.R. 708 (2013)
 Congress.gov
 GovTrack.us
 OpenCongress
 PopVox
 THOMAS
 Notes on the Fair Access to Science and Technology Research Act. From the Harvard Open Access Project.
 FAQ on FASTR from the Scholarly Publishing and Academic Resources Coalition (SPARC)

Open access (publishing)
Proposed legislation of the 113th United States Congress
Proposed legislation of the 114th United States Congress
Proposed legislation of the 115th United States Congress